Catharosia nebulosa is a species of bristle fly in the family Tachinidae.

Distribution
Europe, Russia, Israel, Mongolia.

References

Phasiinae
Insects described in 1815
Taxa named by Carl Fredrik Fallén
Diptera of Europe
Diptera of Asia